Richard Dawson (1855–1923) was an Irish barrister and Conservative politician.

Dawson was born at Limerick,  the son of Richard Dawson of Bunratty, County Clare. He was educated at Hertford College, Oxford and became a barrister.

In the 1885 general election, Dawson was elected Member of Parliament for Leeds East but lost the seat against the trend in the 1886 general election. He  was private secretary to Rt. Hon. Henry Chaplin, Chancellor of the Duchy of Lancaster from 1885 to 1886.
Dawson died at the age of 68.

References

External links 
 

1855 births
1923 deaths
Alumni of Hertford College, Oxford
Conservative Party (UK) MPs for English constituencies
UK MPs 1885–1886
Lawyers from Limerick (city)